The Federal-Aid Highway Amendments of 1974 was signed into law by President of the United States Gerald Ford on January 4, 1975. Among other changes, the law permanently implemented a national 55-mph speed limit (which had already been a temporary limit) for the Interstate Highway System. It also established the Federal Bridge Gross Weight Formula as law, which governed the weight-to-length ratio of trucks in order to protect highway bridges and infrastructure.

See also
Federal-Aid Highway Act
Speed limits in the United States

References

1974 in law
United States federal transportation legislation
Interstate Highway System
Presidency of Gerald Ford